Labrador City is a town in western Labrador (part of the Canadian province of Newfoundland and Labrador), near the Quebec border. With a population of 7,412 as of 2021, it is the second-largest population centre in Labrador, behind Happy Valley-Goose Bay. Neighbouring Labrador City is Wabush, a smaller town with a population of approximately 1,964 as of 2021. Together, the "twin towns" are known as Labrador West.

In the 1960s, Labrador City was founded to accommodate employees of the Iron Ore Company of Canada, and iron ore mining continues to be the primary industry in the town.

The Labrador City town motto is Kamistiatusset, a Naskapi word meaning "land of the hard-working people."  The Labrador City town crest is that of a snowy owl holding a scroll atop a black spade on a mound of red earth. The symbol represents iron ore mining. The spade is flanked by two caribou. Both snowy owls and caribou are native to the Labrador City area.

Government
Belinda Adams was appointed as mayor in 2022.

Since a 2013 by-election, the federal riding of Labrador seat has been held by Yvonne Jones, a Liberal Party member, while New Democrat Jordan Brown has represented Labrador West in the provincial House of Assembly since 2019.

In 2017, MHA Graham Letto and Labrador City Mayor Wayne Button stated that the municipal governments of Labrador City and Wabush are looking into the idea of amalgamation.

Economy
Labrador City was built around the rich iron ore deposits of the Labrador Trough by the Iron Ore Company of Canada (IOC) in the 1960s. The Carol Project is the major iron ore mining operation for the area. In 2008, IOC and their parent company Rio Tinto announced they would spend $800 million to develop additional mines in the region. However, only a few months after announcing the second phase of their expansion, the project was shelved due to the economic recession and low demand for steel. With the world recovering from the economic crisis, it is believed that IOC will go ahead with their expansion in the near future.

The town is serviced by the Wabush Airport, and the airlines flying out of the airport are Provincial Airlines, Air Inuit and Pascan Aviation. Additionally, the Quebec North Shore and Labrador Railway provides freight rail transportation to and from Sept-Îles. The Trans-Labrador Highway (Route 500) serves as the only road connection to Labrador City, connecting it with the rest of Labrador as well as the neighbouring province of Quebec, becoming Quebec Route 389 at the border.

The town contains an ice arena, the Labrador City Arena and a ski club, the Menihek Nordic Ski Club.

The main shopping centre in the town, the  Labrador Mall, includes a Walmart; there is also an IGA grocery store.  Owned by the Westcliff Group, the mall opened in 1978 and is the largest shopping mall in Labrador; it is also the only enclosed mall.

There is a Masonic lodge in Labrador City, Lodge Anik No 1707 of the District Grand Lodge of Newfoundland and Labrador of the Grand Lodge of Scotland.

Demographics 

Attractions
Basilica of our Lady of Perpetual Help

Climate
Wabush and Labrador City has a continental subarctic climate (Köppen: Dfc), with mild summers and severely cold winters. Precipitation is heavy year round (although higher in summer) due to the strong Icelandic Low to the east driving cold, moist and unstable air onto the region. Despite its moderate latitude around the same as cities like Berlin, London, and Amsterdam, its annual mean temperature is     colder.

See also
 List of cities and towns in Newfoundland and Labrador
 Wabush, neighbouring twin town of Labrador City
 Fermont, nearest town in Quebec

Notable residents

Notable former residents of Labrador City include:

 Damhnait Doyle, singer-songwriter
 Margot Kidder, actress
 Dan LaCosta, National Hockey League goaltender
 Pascal Pelletier, National Hockey League player
 Chad Penney, National Hockey League player
 Mark Nichols, 2006 Turin Olympics gold medallist curler

References

External links

 
 Labrador West website
 The Aurora newspaper (published by Transcontinental)
Labrador City - Encyclopedia of Newfoundland and Labrador, vol. 3, p. 221-222.

1960s establishments in Newfoundland and Labrador
 
Mining communities in Newfoundland and Labrador
Towns in Newfoundland and Labrador